Cherished is the 14th studio album by American singer-actress Cher released in September 1977 as Cher's final studio album released by Warner Bros. Records. This album, like several other predecessors, was a commercial failure and failed to chart. The album was promoted by the release of the lead single, Pirate which charted at #97 on the Billboard Hot 100 and a second single, War Paint and Soft Feathers which failed to chart.  Pirate was the only single from the 70s Warner era to chart despite the album being her lowest selling album of her entire career.

Album information 
Released in 1977, Cherished was the last Cher album produced by Snuff Garrett. Although The Cher Show was a top 10 ratings hit, the 1975-77 period was unsuccessful for her, and Cherished did no better than its predecessors, Stars and I'd Rather Believe in You. The album sold very little, failed in the charts and was ignored by critics and fans. Also, Cher was dissatisfied with the final results of the album, and in an interview, she said that she never enjoyed making this album and only made it because of the contract deal with Warner Bros.

The style of the record recalls past hits "Dark Lady" and "Half Breed". Cherished is also Cher's first album without her name on the cover because the title of the album is a pun of the Cher name.

Two unsuccessful singles were released. The first was "Pirate", which reached #93 in Billboard. This song was also the first track on some versions of I'd Rather Believe in You, and in Australia the track was retitled "Images". A follow-up to "Pirate", "War Paint and Soft Feathers", did not chart.

As with her other two Warner Bros. releases, Cherished has never had a legitimate reissue in any format. According to Billboard, Cher owned this album's master rights and Warner had no right to reissue. However, in August 20, 2021, Cher released all 11 tracks, "restored and remastered", on her YouTube channel.

Track listing

Personnel 
 Cher - lead vocals
 Steve Dorff, Al Capps - arranger, conductor
 Snuff Garrett - record producer
 Lenny Roberts - sound engineer
 Randy Tominaga - assistant engineer
 Taavi Mote - assistant engineer
 Harry Langdon - photography

References

External links 
 

1977 albums
Cher albums
Albums produced by Snuff Garrett
Warner Records albums